Puppy Gristle is an album released as a part of cEvin Key's subscription-service "From the Vault" in 2002, under the Skinny Puppy name. This was planned to be a limited-edition, subscription-only release of 1,000 copies available exclusively through the label's mailorder. It was eventually re-issued in larger quantities as a digipak in 2002/2003.

Track listing

Personnel
Genesis P. Orridge (gristle box)
Dwayne Rudolph Goettel (setup one - digital)
cEvin Key (setup two - analog)
Larry Thrasher (percussion)
N. Ogre (vocal)
Ken Hiwatt Marshall (engineer and fx)
Chris Carter (gristle box design and build)
Simon Paul, Scott Graham (cover layout)

Notes
This release was recorded as a live improvised jam session one afternoon, at 30065 Morning View Drive in Malibu, California.

This performance was mixed by Ken Marshall in 1993, though it was reassembled and remixed in 2002 by cEvin Key.

Sections of this composition were previously heard on the Psychic TV compilations Electric Newspaper. Issue.Two and Electric Newspaper. Issue.Three, as well as on Download's Charlie's Family and The Eyes of Stanley Pain.

The release features liner notes by Key and P-Orridge, though none by Ogre or Thrasher. In 2006, Thrasher recalled the sessions on the Internet with this statement (verbatim):

References

External links
 Puppy Gristle at Discogs

2002 EPs
Skinny Puppy EPs
Albums recorded at Shangri-La (recording studio)